The 2022 season for the  team is the team's 11th season in existence, all of which have been as a UCI WorldTeam.

Australian cycling retailer BikeExchange continues as a title sponsor for a second consecutive season and third season overall, with recreational vehicle manufacturer Jayco Australia, another brand owned by team owner Gerry Ryan, joining as a new co-title sponsor. Additionally, the team changed bicycle suppliers for the second consecutive season, dropping Bianchi after one season for Giant bicycles with Shimano drivetrain, Cadex wheels and Giordana clothing.

Team roster 

Riders who joined the team for the 2022 season

Riders who left the team during or after the 2021 season

Season victories

National, Continental, and World Champions

Notes

References

External links 

 

Team BikeExchange–Jayco (men's team)
2022
Team BikeExchange–Jayco (men's team)